The 2021 World Kata Championships were held from 26 to 27 October 2021 in Lisbon, Portugal. During the 2021 World Kata Championships the athletes entered could perform in 5 kata (Nage-no-kata, Katame-no-kata, Ju-no-kata, Kime-no-kata, Kodokan-Goshin-jutsu), two of which (Nage-no-kata and katame-no-kata) were also accessible for the first time to junior competitors aged under 23.

Medalists

Medal table

Results

Nage-no-kata

Group 1

Group 2

Final

Katame-no-kata

Group 1

Group 2

Final

Ju-no-kata

Group 1

Group 2

Final

Kime-no-kata

Group 1

Group 2

Final

Kodokan-goshin-jutsu

Group 1

Group 2

Final

Nage-no-kata (Junior)

Preliminary

Final

Katame-no-kata (Junior)

Preliminary

FInal

References

Kata
October 2021 sports events in Portugal
Sports competitions in Lisbon